The Scotia Tower is a skyscraper in downtown Montreal, Quebec, Canada. It was designed by WZMH Architects and constructed in 1990. It was built in the postmodern architectural style, with granite and glass facades. Tour Scotia is located at 1002 Sherbrooke Street West opposite McTavish Street, and is linked to Montreal's Underground City and Peel station on the Montreal Metro.

See also
 List of tallest buildings in Montreal
 Scotia Plaza - Toronto corporate offices
 Scotia Place in Edmonton

References

External links
 MONIT - 1002 Sherbrooke O.

Skyscrapers in Montreal
Office buildings completed in 1990
Postmodern architecture in Canada
Scotiabank
Bank buildings in Canada
Downtown Montreal
Skyscraper office buildings in Canada